Heiden may refer to:

Municipalities 
Heiden, Germany
Heiden, Switzerland

People 
Heiden (surname)

Other uses 
Heiden (Shinto), the offertory hall of a Shinto shrine

See also 
Heyden (disambiguation)
Haiden (disambiguation)
Hayden (disambiguation)
Haydn (disambiguation)
Port Heiden, Alaska